Rayner Peak is a prominent peak, 1,270 m, standing 35 nautical miles (60 km) southwest of the head of Edward VIII Bay and 2 nautical miles (3.7 km) west of Robert Glacier. It was discovered in February 1936 by DI personnel on the William Scoresby and was named for George W. Rayner, a zoologist on the DI staff and leader of the expedition.

See also
Edward Ridge

References

Mountains of Enderby Land